Route 289 is a state highway in eastern Connecticut, running from Lebanon center to Willimantic in the town of Windham.

Route description
Route 289 begins at an intersection with Route 87 north of the town center of Lebanon. It heads north and northeast for about  through rural areas to the  Windham town line.  In Windham, the road becomes known as Mountain Street and heads north to end at an intersection with Route 32 in Willimantic.

Route 289 is designated the Beaumont Memorial Highway after William Beaumont (1785–1853), a pioneering researcher in human digestion.

History
In 1922, the Lebanon-Willimantic route was designated as a state highway known as Highway 214. In the 1932 state highway renumbering, Route 89 was established. It ran from Lebanon via Willimantic, Mansfield Center, Warrenville, and Westford up to Union and incorporated the entirety of old Highway 214. In 1964, Route 195 was extended south from Mansfield Center to Willimantic using part of Route 89, truncating the south end of Route 89. The former section of Route 89 south of Willimantic (old Highway 214) was renumbered to Route 289. It has had no significant changes since.

Junction list

References

External links

289
Transportation in New London County, Connecticut
Transportation in Windham County, Connecticut
Transportation in Windham, Connecticut